Lysimachia is a genus consisting of 193 accepted species of flowering plants traditionally classified in the family Primulaceae. Based on a molecular phylogenetic study it was transferred to the family Myrsinaceae, before this family was later merged into the Primulaceae.

Characteristics
Lysimachia species often have yellow flowers, and grow vigorously. They tend to grow in damp conditions. Several species within Lysimachia are commonly called loosestrife, although this name is also used for plants within the genus Lythrum.  The genus is named in honor of Lysimachus, a king of ancient Sicily, who is said to have calmed a mad ox by feeding it a member of the genus.

Lysimachia species are used as food plants by the larvae of some butterflies and moths, including the dot moth, grey pug, lime-speck pug, small angle shades, and v-pug.

Specialized pollinators 
Bees of the genus Macropis are specialized to pollinate oil-producing Lysimachia plants. These bees use exclusively Lysimachia floral oils for building their nests and provisioning cells. Lysimachia floral-specific chemicals are strong attractors for Macropis nuda and Macropis fulvipes bees that are seldom found in other plant genera.

Fossil record
Several fossil seeds of Lysimachia  sp. have been described from middle Miocene strata of the Fasterholt area near Silkeborg in Central Jutland, Denmark. †Lysimachia  nikitinii seed fossils have been collected from Pliocene strata of south eastern Belarus. The fossils are most similar to seeds of the East Asian Lysimachia davurica.

Selected species

Lysimachia arvensis L. - Scarlet pimpernel
Lysimachia asperulifolia, orth. var. L. asperulaefolia - roughleaf yellow loosestrife (endemic to Atlantic coastal plain in North and South Carolina)
Lysimachia atropurpurea  - purple gooseneck loosestrife
Lysimachia azorica Hornem. ex Hook. - (endemic to the Azores)
Lysimachia barystachys Bunge - Manchurian yellow loosestrife
Lysimachia ciliata L. - fringed loosestrife (North America)
Lysimachia clethroides  - gooseneck loosestrife
Lysimachia × commixta , a hybrid of L. terrestris and L. thyrsiflora
 Lysimachia congestiflora
Lysimachia daphnoides (A. Gray) Hillebr. Lehua makanoe (Island of Kauai in Hawaii)
Lysimachia filifolia C.N.Forbes (Islands of Oahu and Kauai in Hawaii)
Lysimachia foenum-graecum Hance
Lysimachia fraseri Duby - Fraser's yellow loosestrife (Southeastern United States)
Lysimachia glutinosa
Lysimachia hillebrandii Hook. f. ex A. Gray - kolokolo kuahiwi (Hawaii)
Lysimachia hybrida Michx.
Lysimachia iniki - Wailua River yellow loosestrife (endemic to Kauai, Hawaii)
Lysimachia japonica
Lysimachia latifolia - Pacific starflower
Lysimachia lichiangensis Forrest
Lysimachia lydgatei - Maui yellow loosestrife  (endemic to Maui, Hawaii)
Lysimachia maritima
Lysimachia mauritiana
Lysimachia maxima (R.Knuth) H. St. John (Island of Molokai in Hawaii)
Lysimachia minoricensis J.J. Rodr. (Spain)
Lysimachia nemorum L. - yellow pimpernel
Lysimachia nummularia L. - creeping jenny, moneywort (Europe, introduced in North America)
Lysimachia pendens
Lysimachia × producta , a hybrid of L. terrestris and L. quadrifolia
Lysimachia punctata  - spotted loosestrife
Lysimachia quadriflora Sims - four-flower yellow loosestrife (Eastern North America)
Lysimachia quadrifolia L. - whorled loosestrife (Eastern North America)
Lysimachia scopulensis
Lysimachia sertulata  - Chilean melilukul
Lysimachia terrestris (L.) Britton, Sterns & Poggenb. - swamp candles (North America)
Lysimachia thyrsiflora - tufted loosestrife
Lysimachia venosa - veined yellow loosestrife (endemic to Kauai, Hawaii)
Lysimachia verticillaris 
Lysimachia vulgaris L. - garden loosestrife, yellow loosestrife (Eurasia)

References

External links
Lysimachus' Dog & Nisaean Horses - Informative but non-scholarly essay on Lysimachia & Lysimachus (Annotated with Sources).
Pictures of Lysimachia sertulata.
PAF - Lysimachia clethroides - Duby.

 
Primulaceae genera
Taxa named by Carl Linnaeus